These are the results from the synchronised swimming competition at the 2001 World Aquatics Championships.  The competition was only open to women.

Medal table

Medal summary

 
2001 in synchronized swimming
Synchronised swimming
Synchronised swimming at the World Aquatics Championships